A megakaryocyte (mega- + karyo- + -cyte, "large-nucleus cell") is a large bone marrow cell with a lobated nucleus responsible for the production of blood thrombocytes (platelets), which are necessary for normal blood clotting. In humans, megakaryocytes usually account for 1 out of 10,000 bone marrow cells, but can increase in number nearly 10-fold during the course of certain diseases. Owing to variations in combining forms and spelling, synonyms include megalokaryocyte and  megacaryocyte.

Structure
In general, megakaryocytes are 10 to 15 times larger than a typical red blood cell, averaging 50–100 μm in diameter. During its maturation, the megakaryocyte grows in size and replicates its DNA without cytokinesis in a process called endomitosis.  As a result, the nucleus of the megakaryocyte can become very large and lobulated, which, under a light microscope, can give the false impression that there are several nuclei.  In some cases, the nucleus may contain up to 64N DNA, or 32 copies of the normal complement of DNA in a human cell.

The cytoplasm, just as the platelets that bud off from it, contains α-granula and dense bodies.

Development 

Megakaryocytes are derived from hematopoietic stem cell precursor cells in the bone marrow. They are produced primarily by the liver, kidney, spleen, and bone marrow. These multipotent stem cells live in the marrow sinusoids and are capable of producing all types of blood cells depending on the signals they receive. The primary signal for megakaryocyte production is thrombopoietin or TPO. TPO is sufficient but not absolutely necessary for inducing differentiation of progenitor cells in the bone marrow towards a final megakaryocyte phenotype. Other molecular signals for megakaryocyte differentiation include GM-CSF, IL-3, IL-6, IL-11, chemokines (SDF-1, FGF-4) and erythropoietin. The megakaryocyte develops through the following lineage:

CFU-Me (pluripotential hemopoietic stem cell or hemocytoblast) → megakaryoblast → promegakaryocyte → megakaryocyte.

The cell eventually reaches megakaryocyte stage and loses its ability to divide. However, it is still able to replicate its DNA and continue development, becoming polyploid. The cytoplasm continues to expand and the DNA amount can increase up to 64n in humans and 256n in mice.  Many of the morphological features of megakaryocyte differentiation can be recapitulated in non-hematopoietic cells by the expression of Class VI β-tubulin (β6)  and they provide a mechanistic basis for understanding these changes.

Function

Platelet release 
Once the cell has completed differentiation and become a mature megakaryocyte, it begins the process of producing platelets.  The maturation process occurs via endomitotic synchronous replication whereby the cytoplasmic volume enlarges as the number of chromosomes multiplies without cellular division.  The cell ceases its growth at 4N, 8N or 16N, becomes granular, and begins to produce platelets.  Thrombopoietin plays a role in inducing the megakaryocyte to form small proto-platelet processes. Platelets are held within these internal membranes within the cytoplasm of megakaryocytes. There are two proposed mechanisms for platelet release. In one scenario, these proto-platelet processes break up explosively to become platelets. It is possible to visualize the spontaneous release of platelets using holotomographic live cell imaging. Alternatively, the cell may form platelet ribbons into blood vessels.  The ribbons are formed via pseudopodia and they are able to continuously emit platelets into circulation. In either scenario, each of these proto-platelet processes can give rise to 2000–5000 new platelets upon breakup. Overall, 2/3 of these newly produced platelets will remain in circulation while 1/3 will be sequestered by the spleen.

Thrombopoietin (TPO) is a 353-amino acid protein encoded on chromosome 3p27. TPO is primarily synthesized in the liver but can be made by kidneys, testes, brain, and even bone marrow stromal cells. It has high homology with erythropoietin. It is essential for the formation of an adequate quantity of platelets.

After budding off platelets, what remains is mainly the cell nucleus. This crosses the bone marrow barrier to the blood and is consumed in the lung by alveolar macrophages.

Effects of cytokines 
Cytokines are signals used in the immune system for intercellular communication. There are many cytokines that affect megakaryocytes. Certain cytokines such as IL-3, IL-6, IL-11, LIF, erythropoietin, and thrombopoietin all stimulate the maturation of megakaryocytic progenitor cells. Other signals such as PF4, CXCL5, CXCL7, and CCL5 inhibit platelet formation.

Clinical significance
Megakaryocytes are directly responsible for producing platelets, which are needed for the formation of a thrombus, or blood clot. There are several diseases that are directly attributable to abnormal megakaryocyte function or abnormal platelet function.

Essential thrombocythemia

Essential thrombocythemia (ET) is a disorder characterized by elevated numbers of circulating platelets. The disease occurs in 1–2 per 100,000 people. The 2016 WHO requirements for diagnosis include > 450,000 platelets/μL of blood (normal 150,000–400,000) and characteristic findings in a bone marrow biopsy. Some of the consequences of having such high numbers of platelets include thrombosis or clots in blood vessels. Thrombi form more frequently in arteries than veins. It seems ironic that having platelet counts above 1,000,000 platelets/μL can lead to hemorrhagic events. Approximately half ET cases are due to a mutation in the JAK2 protein, a member of the JAK-STAT pathway. This mutation induces an unregulated proliferative signal from the thrombopoietin (TPO) receptor in the absence of TPO causing clonal expansion of bone marrow cells, especially megakaryocytes. There is a low risk of transformation to leukemia with this disorder. The primary treatment consists of anagrelide or hydroxyurea to lower platelet levels.

Congenital amegakaryocytic thrombocytopenia
Congenital amegakaryocytic thrombocytopenia (CAMT) is a rare inherited disorder. The primary manifestations are thrombocytopenia and megakaryocytopenia, i.e. low numbers of platelets and megakaryocytes. There is an absence of megakaryocytes in the bone marrow with no associated physical abnormalities. The cause for this disorder appears to be a mutation in the gene for the TPO receptor, c-mpl, despite high levels of serum TPO. In addition, there may be abnormalities with the central nervous system including the cerebrum and cerebellum that could cause symptoms. The primary treatment for CAMT is bone marrow transplantation.

Bone marrow/stem cell transplant is the only remedy for this genetic disease.  Frequent platelet transfusions are required to keep the patient from bleeding to death until transplant has been completed, although this is not always the case.

There appears to be no generic resource for CAMT patients on the web and this is potentially due to the rarity of the disease.

History
 In 1906, James Homer Wright provided evidence that megakaryocytes give rise to blood platelets.

Kelemen first coined the term "thrombopoietin" to describe the humoral substance responsible for the production of platelets.

References

External links 
 Megakaryocytes: Mature Many microscopic images of mature megakaryocytes including in disease settings.
 Megakaryocytes
 Cell size comparison
 CAMT Specific Infant Bone Marrow Transplant Journal

Leukocytes
Human cells